Robert Kendall may refer to:

 Robert Kendall (poet), writer
 Robert Kendall (actor) (1927–2009), American actor